Chris Dean Carr (born March 12, 1974) is an American former professional basketball player who was selected by the Phoenix Suns in the 2nd round (56th overall) of the 1995 NBA draft, and currently an assistant coach and director of student-athlete development for the Kansas State University women's basketball team. Carr played six seasons in the NBA for the Phoenix Suns, Minnesota Timberwolves, New Jersey Nets, Golden State Warriors, Chicago Bulls and Boston Celtics.

Carr also appeared in the 1997 NBA Slam Dunk Contest, and made it to the final round, before losing to Kobe Bryant. Carr played collegiately at Southern Illinois University Carbondale. He also played in Greece with AEK Athens BC and in Serbia with KK Lavovi 063.

External links
Player profile @ aek.com

K-State Bio
Drury Bio

1974 births
Living people
AEK B.C. players
African-American basketball players
American expatriate basketball people in Greece
American expatriate basketball people in Serbia
American men's basketball players
Basketball players from Missouri
Boston Celtics players
Chicago Bulls players
Golden State Warriors players
Greek Basket League players
KK Lavovi 063 players
Minnesota Timberwolves players
New Jersey Nets players
People from Ironton, Missouri
Phoenix Suns draft picks
Phoenix Suns players
Shooting guards
Southern Illinois Salukis men's basketball players
21st-century African-American sportspeople
20th-century African-American sportspeople